Gokabou (五家宝) is one of the Japanese wagashi, which is made and sold mainly in Saitama prefecture. Okoshi, a sweetened cake made of rice is mixed with sugar and then shaped into a thumb-sized cylinder. Wrapped in a sheet made by starch syrup and soybean powder and coated with soybean powder. Gokabou is known as Saitama prefecture Kumagaya city souvenir sweet. They are rarely served as a dessert for school lunch in the public elementary and secondary school. 

Gokabou is one of the three famous confection in Saitama along with Soka Senbei from Kazo city and Imogashi (desserts made of sweet potatoes) from Kawagoe city. It is also qualified as one of the ten soundscapes of Saitama. The name, Gokabou, means that five grains are a family's treasure. It is also one of the special products of the Kazo city and has been sold for the past 150 years.

Since it is a storable sweet, it became popular as a souvenir sweet and spread through Japan. The process for making the sweet entails a unique and traditional technique. It is additive-free sweet which is easy to digest and attracts people as a nourishing sweet.

History 
It was first eaten and made as nonperishables. It gradually shifted and became famous as a homemade sweet. It became popular after 1883 when a railroad was first opened from Ueno to Kumagaya, and people started to sell at the station.

References 

Wagashi